Luka Juričić may refer to:

 Luka Juričić (actor)
 Luka Juričić (footballer)